Agonopterix phaeocausta is a moth in the family Depressariidae. It was described by Edward Meyrick in 1934. It is found in Japan.

References

Moths described in 1934
Agonopterix
Moths of Japan